Andong No clan was one of the Korean clans. Their Bon-gwan was in Andong, North Gyeongsang Province. According to the research in 2000, the number of Andong No clan was 3144. When he was a Hanlin Academy in Tang dynasty, he was dispatched to Silla. He was chosen as Prince of Andong during Silla period. Then, he began Andong No clan.

See also 
 Korean clan names of foreign origin

References

External links 
 

 
Korean clan names of Chinese origin
Clans based in Andong